Meinhard Hemp (born 10 December 1942) is a German former footballer who played for Dynamo Dresden. He later served as a coach at Dynamo, and managed the team for the last few games of the 2000-01 season.

References

1942 births
Living people
East German footballers
Dynamo Dresden players
Dynamo Dresden II players
Dynamo Dresden managers
Dynamo Dresden non-playing staff
DDR-Oberliga players
German footballers needing infoboxes
Association football forwards
German football managers